The War of the End of the World is a 1981 novel written by Peruvian novelist Mario Vargas Llosa. It is a fictionalized account of the War of Canudos conflict in late 19th-century Brazil. 

The War of the End of the World won the 2010 Nobel Prize in Literature.

Plot summary
In the midst of the economic decline — following drought and the end of slavery — in the province of Bahia in Northeastern Brazil, the poor of the backlands are attracted by the charismatic figure and simple religious teachings of Antonio Conselheiro, called "The Counselor", who preaches that the end of the world is imminent and that the political chaos that surrounds the collapse of the Empire of Brazil and its replacement by a republic is the work of the devil.

Seizing a fazenda in an area blighted by economic decline at Canudos the Counselor's followers build a large town and repeatedly defeat growing military expeditions designed to remove them. As the state's violence against them increases, they too turn increasingly violent, even seizing the modern weapons deployed against them. In an epic final clash, a whole army is sent to extirpate Canudos and instigates a terrible and brutal battle with the poor while politicians of the old order see their world destroyed in the conflagration.

Analysis
It is generally believed that Vargas Llosa's three milestone novels are La Ciudad y Los Perros (The Time of the Hero), La Casa Verde (The Green House) and Conversación en la Catedral (Conversation in the Cathedral), though many critics agree that The War of the End of the World should also be included among these three. The author is famously known for considering this his most accomplished novel — an opinion shared by the Chilean novelist Roberto Bolaño , as well as the American critic Harold Bloom, who includes the novel in what he calls the "Western canon".

As he did later on with La Fiesta Del Chivo (The Feast of the Goat), Vargas Llosa tackles a huge number of characters and stories caught during a time of strife, interweaving these in way that gives us a picture of what it was to live in those times.

Characters
 Antônio Conselheiro 
 The Little Blessed One
 The Lion of Natuba: the counselor’s personal scribe. Deformed individual with hair that resembles a lion’s mane. 
 João Abade (Abbot João)
 The Dwarf
 Father Joaquim
 Baron de Canabrava
 Pajeú
 Rufino: husband of Jurema. 
 Galileo Gall
 Maria Quadrado
 Colonel Moreira César: fierce Republican loyalist. Anti-monarchist. Commander of the 7th Regiment. 
 Jurema: wife of Rufino
 The Near-Sighted Journalist
 João Grande (Big João)
 Pires Ferreira
 Antônio Vilanova
 Antônio o Fogueteiro

Awards

References

External links 

 Kirkus Reviews review
 London Review of Books review
 Publishers Weekly review

1981 novels
Novels by Mario Vargas Llosa
Novels set in Bahia
Fiction set in the 1890s
Seix Barral books